Volcano Peak is a  mountain summit located in Tooele County, Utah, United States.

Description
Volcano Peak is situated in the Silver Island Mountains which are a subset of the Great Basin Ranges, and it is set on land managed by the Bureau of Land Management. The community of Wendover, Utah, is six miles to the southwest and line parent Rishel Peak is two miles to the northeast. This landform's toponym has been officially adopted by the U.S. Board on Geographic Names.

Climate
Volcano Peak is set in the Great Salt Lake Desert which has hot summers and cold winters. The desert is an example of a cold desert climate as the desert's elevation makes temperatures cooler than lower elevation deserts. Due to the high elevation and aridity, temperatures drop sharply after sunset. Summer nights are comfortably cool. Winter highs are generally above freezing, and winter nights are bitterly cold, with temperatures often dropping well below freezing.

Gallery

See also
 
 List of mountain peaks of Utah

References

External links
Volcano Peak: weather forecast

Mountains of Utah
Mountains of Tooele County, Utah
North American 1000 m summits
Great Salt Lake Desert
Mountains of the Great Basin